Marc Van de Mieroop (b. 22 October 1956) is a noted Belgian Assyriologist and Egyptologist who has been full professor of Ancient Near Eastern history at Columbia University since 1996.

Biography 
Born in Belgium to a prominent Flemish family who paternally descend from Jan I van Cuijk. He received his bachelor's degree form the Katholieke Universiteit Leuven, later attending Yale University, where he received his master's degree in 1980 and his doctoral degree in 1983. He taught at Yale and Oxford, later becoming a full professor at Columbia in 1996. His son Kenan Van de Mieroop is also a noted professor. Professor Van de Mieroop specializes the history of the Ancient Near East from the beginning of writing to the age of Alexander the Great, with a particular interest in the socio-economic and political history of the Ancient Near East. He has written extensively on historical methodology and was a Senior Fellow at the Internationales Forschungszentrum Kulturwissenschaften in 2011, and a Guggenheim Fellow in 2013. In 2016 he held a fellowship from the ACLS for a project entitled, "Babylonian Cosmopolitanism and the Birth of Greek and Hebrew Literate Traditions."

He is a member of the Editorial Board for Journal of Ancient History.

Publications 
In addition to his articles and translations, his book publications include:
Crafts in the Early Isin Period (1987),
Sumerian Administrative Documents from the Reigns of Ishbi-Erra and Shu-Ilishu (1987)
Society and Enterprise in Old Babylonian Ur (1992)
The Ancient Mesopotamian City (1997 and 1999) Oxford University Press, Oxford. 
Cuneiform Texts and the Writing of History (1999)
King Hammurabi of Babylon (2005) Blackwell, Oxford. 
The Eastern Mediterranean in the Age of Ramesses II (2007) Wiley-Blackwell, Oxford. 
with Bonnie Smith, Richard von Glahn, and Kris Lane, Crossroads and Cultures. A History of the World's Peoples (2012), Bedford-St. Martin, 
A History of the Ancient Near East, ca. 3000–323 BC (2015) Wiley-Blackwell, Oxford. 
Philosophy before the Greeks. The Pursuit of Truth in Ancient Babylonia (2015), Princeton University Press. 
A History of Ancient Egypt (2021) Wiley-Blackwell, Oxford. 
The Practice of Ancient Near Eastern History - Opera Minora (2022) (Alter Orient und Altes Testament 400), Ugarit Verlag: Münster. 
Before and After Babel: Writing as Resistance in Ancient Near Eastern Empires (2023) Oxford University Press, New York

References

See also 
Columbia University: Marc Van de Mieroop
Archaeology Magazine Interview
Podcast Interview
Philosophy Interview
On Bronze Age Collapse, BBC, The Forum

1958 births
Living people
20th-century Belgian historians
Columbia University faculty
21st-century Belgian historians